The 1992 NCAA Division II men's basketball tournament involved 32 schools playing in a single-elimination tournament to determine the national champion of men's NCAA Division II college basketball as a culmination of the 1991-92 NCAA Division II men's basketball season. It was won by Virginia Union University and Virginia Union's Derrick Johnson was the Most Outstanding Player.

Regional participants

*denotes tie

Regionals

New England - Manchester, New Hampshire 
Location: NHC Fieldhouse Host: New Hampshire College

Third Place - Merrimack 105, Assumption 84

South Central - Topeka, Kansas 
Location: Lee Arena Host: Washburn University

Third Place - Texas A&M–Kingsville 97, Missouri Western State 83

North Central - Brookings, South Dakota 
Location: Frost Arena Host: South Dakota State University

Third Place - North Dakota 80, St. Cloud State 60

East - California, Pennsylvania 
Location: Hamer Hall Host: California University of Pennsylvania

Third Place - St. Rose 59, Pace 52

South Atlantic - Jacksonville, Alabama 
Location: Pete Mathews Coliseum Host: Jacksonville State University

Third Place - Troy 110, Rollins 92

West - Bakersfield, California 
Location: CSUB Student Activities Center Host: California State University, Bakersfield

Third Place - Grand Canyon 88, Chico State 87

Great Lakes - Owensboro, Kentucky 
Location: Owensboro Sportscenter Host: Kentucky Wesleyan College

Third Place - St. Joseph's (IN) 74, Grand Valley State 64*

South - Fayetteville, North Carolina 
Location: Felton J. Capel Arena Hosts: Fayetteville State University and Virginia Union University

Third Place - Albany State 73, Norfolk State 70

*denotes each overtime played

Elite Eight - Springfield, Massachusetts
Location: Springfield Civic Center Hosts: American International College and Springfield College

*denotes each overtime played

All-tournament team
 Derrick Johnson (Virginia Union)
 Reggie Jones (Virginia Union)
 Winston Jones (Bridgeport)
 Kenney Toomer (California (PA))
 Steve Wills (Bridgeport)

See also
1992 NCAA Division I men's basketball tournament
1992 NCAA Division III men's basketball tournament
1992 NAIA Division I men's basketball tournament
1992 NAIA Division II men's basketball tournament
1992 NCAA Division II women's basketball tournament

References
 1992 NCAA Division II men's basketball tournament jonfmorse.com

External links
 NCAA record book

NCAA Division II men's basketball tournament
Tournament
NCAA Division II basketball tournament
NCAA Division II basketball tournament